EPAA may refer to:
Executive Personal Assistant Association
 East Pasco Adventist Academy, Dade City, Florida 
 École de pilotage de l'Armée de l'air
 Education Policy Analysis Archives
 Emergency Petroleum Allocation Act of 1973
 Environmental Planning and Assessment Act 1979
 European Partnership for Alternative Approaches to Animal Testing
 European Phased Adaptive Approach